This is a list of rural localities in Moscow Oblast. Moscow Oblast, or Podmoskovye (literally "around/near Moscow"), is a federal subject of Russia (an oblast). The oblast has no official administrative center; its public authorities are located in Moscow and across other locations in the oblast.

Chekhovsky District 
Rural localities in Chekhovsky District:

 Chepelyovo

Dmitrovsky District 
Rural localities in Dmitrovsky District:

 Abramtsevo
 Abramtsevo

Dmitrovsky District 
Rural localities in Dmitrovsky District:

 3rd Uchastok
 4th Uchastok
 Novosinkovo
 Paramonovo
 Rogachevo

Domodedovsky District 
Rural localities in Domodedovsky District:

 Avdotyino
 Lyamtsino

Istrinsky District 
Rural localities in Istrinsky District:

 Alyokhnovo

Krasnogorsky District 
Rural localities in Krasnogorsky District:

 Petrovo-Dalneye

Leninsky District 
Rural localities in Leninsky District:

 Razvilka

Lotoshinsky District 
Rural localities in Lotoshinsky District:

 Abushkovo

Lukhovitsky District 
Rural localities in Lukhovitsky District:

 Dedinovo

Mozhaysky District 
Rural localities in Mozhaysky District:

 Avdotyino

Mozhaysky District 
Rural localities in Mozhaysky District:

 Borodino

Mytishchinsky District 
Rural localities in Mytishchinsky District:

 Abbakumovo
 Laryovo
 Marfino
 Trudovaya

Noginsky District 
Rural localities in Noginsky District:

 2nd Biserovskiy uchastok
 Aborino
 Avdotyino

Odintsovsky District 
Rural localities in Odintsovsky District:

 Barvikha
 Barvikha
 Butyn
 Posyolok abonentnogo yaschika 001
 Skolkovo
 Zhavoronki

Orekhovo-Zuyevsky District 
Rural localities in Orekhovo-Zuyevsky District:

 Abramovka
 Antsiferovo
 Barskoye
 Davydovo
 Gora
 Gubino
 Ilyinsky Pogost
 Khoteichi
 Kostino
 Lyakhovo
 Settlement on the 1st of May
 Slobodishche
 Ustyanovo
 Yelizarovo
 Zaponorye

Pushkinsky District 
Rural localities in Pushkinsky District:

 Muranovo

Ramensky District 
Rural localities in Ramensky District:

 Gzhel
 Gzhelskogo kirpichnogo zavoda
 Myachkovo
 Verkhneye Myachkovo
 Zyuzino

Selyatino 
Rural localities in Selyatino:

 Alabino

Sergiyevo-Posadsky District 
Rural localities in Sergiyevo-Posadsky District:

 Abramovo
 Abramtsevo
 Buzhaninovo
 Gagino
 Radonezh

Shakhovskoy District 
Rural localities in Shakhovskoy District:

 Maloe Krutoe

Shatura 
Rural localities in Shatura:

 Bakhscheevo

Shatursky District 
Rural localities in Shatursky District:

 12 posyolok
 18 posyolok
 19 posyolok
 21 posyolok

Shchyolkovsky District 
Rural localities in Shchyolkovsky District:

 Grebnevo

Solnechnogorsky District 
Rural localities in Solnechnogorsky District:

 2nd Smirnovka
 5th Gorki
 Lyalovo

Stupinsky District 
Rural localities in Stupinsky District:

 2nd Pyatiletka
 Avdotyino
 Avdotyino
 Avdulovo-1
 Avdulovo-2

Volokolamsky District 
Rural localities in Volokolamsky District:

 Avdotyino
 Yaropolets

Yegoryevsky District 
Rural localities in Yegoryevsky District:

 Gridino

Yegoryevsky District 
Rural localities in Yegoryevsky District:

 Abryutkovo
 Alyoshino
 Kolionovo
 Shuvoye

Zaraysky District 
Rural localities in Zaraysky District:

 Altukhovo
 Altukhovo
 Aponitishchi
 Astramyevo
 Avdeyevo
 Borisovo-Okolitsy
 Chiryakovo
 Gololobovo

See also 
 
 Lists of rural localities in Russia

References

Moscow Oblast